The  is a railway line in Japan operated by the private railway operator Kintetsu Railway. The line connects Kawachi-Yamamoto Station and Shigisanguchi Station. The entire line is located in the city of Yao, and is 2.8 km long. At Kawachi-Yamamoto, the line connects to the Osaka Line, and at Shigisanguchi, to the Nishi-Shigi Cable Line. The line opened in 1930, and has a ruling gradient of 40.0‰.

Stations

History
The line opened on 15 December 1930.

References

Shigi Line
Rail transport in Osaka Prefecture
Standard gauge railways in Japan